Ŭnsan station is a railway station in Ŭnsan-ŭp, Ŭnsan county, South P'yŏngan province, North Korea. It is the junction point of the Korean State Railway's P'yŏngra and Ŭnsan lines. It is also the starting point of the P'yŏngra line's Changsŏn'gang Line.

References

Railway stations in North Korea